Peykar was a weekly newspaper in Iran that was published as the official organ of the communist organization Organization of Struggle for the Emancipation of the Working Class.

127 issues of Peykar were published between April 1979 and October 1981. Torab Haghshenas served as the editor of the newspaper.

Peykar was among left-wing publications that the Tudeh Party of Iran was critical of.

References 

1979 establishments in Iran
1981 disestablishments in Iran
Communist newspapers published in Iran
Defunct newspapers published in Iran
Persian-language newspapers